The Sainte Sophie landfill is located in Ste. Sophie, Quebec, north of Montreal. Initially operated by Intersan since 1997, it is now operated by Waste Management and collects approximately 850,000 metric tonnes (937,000 tons) of waste annually. Along with the Lachenaie landfill, these two sites collect garbage for the Greater Montreal Area.

It is located on 2535 1re rue, Ste Sophie, QC J5J 2R7. Its hours are Monday to Friday 4:00 am to 6:00 pm. 

The  site has a gas-to-energy project with Gaz Metro, Quebec's leading natural gas distributor, and Cascades Inc., one of Canada's largest pulp and paper companies.  By using these techniques, waste capacity in a typical
landfill can be increased by at least 15 to 30 percent.

In 2003, Waste Management implemented a bioreactor operation at the Sainte Sophie landfill, a method of increasing the moisture content of the landfill waste to speed up decomposition and thus produce gas more quickly. to test its environmental and economic benefits. 

In 2005, the Quebec government approved the expansion of the Sainte Sophie landfill to give it an annual capacity of one million tonnes.

References

See also
 Lachenaie landfill
 External website on the Ste. Sophie landfill

Landfills in Canada
Laurentides